Katharina Fegebank (born 27 February 1977) is a German politician for the Alliance '90/The Greens, who has served as Second Mayor of Hamburg and Senator for Science, Research and Equality since 2015. She briefly served as acting First Mayor in March 2018.

Background

Fegebank grew up in Bargteheide, as the daughter of two teachers.

Political career

On 22 June 2008, Fegebank was elected chair of the Green-Alternative List (GAL) in Hamburg, and became the youngest ever leader of a Green state association. Since 15 April 2015 she serves as Second Mayor of Hamburg as well as Senator for Science, Research, and Equal Rights in the Senate Scholz II. In this capacity, she is one of the state's representatives at the Bundesrat.

Fegebank was a Green Party delegate to the Federal Convention for the purpose of electing the President of Germany in 2017 and in 2022.

On 14 March 2018, Fegebank became the acting head of the government of Hamburg after Olaf Scholz moved to the new Federal Government, until Peter Tschentscher was elected new Mayor of Hamburg on 28 March 2018. She continued to serve as Second Mayor and Senator for Science, Research, and Equal Rights in his government.

In the negotiations to form a so-called traffic light coalition of the Social Democrats (SPD), the Green Party and the FDP following the 2021 federal elections, Fegebank led her party's delegation in the working group on innovation and research; her co-chairs from the other parties are Thomas Losse-Müller and Lydia Hüskens.

Other activities
 Aby Warburg Foundation, Chairwoman of the Board
 Academy of Sciences and Humanities in Hamburg, Ex-Officio Member of the Board of Trustees
 Alexander Otto Sportstiftung, Member of the Advisory Board
 Hamburgische Regenbogenstiftung, Member of the Board of Trustees
 Institute for the History of the German Jews (Institut für die Geschichte der deutschen Juden, IGdJ), Hamburg, Chair of the Advisory Board (Kuratorium)
 Hamburg Marketing Gesellschaft mbH (HMG GmbH), Ex-Officio Member of the Supervisory Board
 Hamburg Media School (HMS), Member of the Supervisory Board
 Helmholtz Association of German Research Centres, Ex-Officio Member of the Senate
 Max Planck Institute for Comparative and International Private Law, Member of the Board of Trustees
 Max Planck Institute for Meteorology, Member of the Board of Trustees
 University Medical Center Hamburg-Eppendorf, Chairwoman of the Board of Trustees

Political positions
Fegebank supports a ban on full-face veils in schools, arguing that the burqa and the niqāb are "symbols of oppression".

Personal life
Fegebank has been in a relationship with businessman Mathias Wolf since 2015. In 2018, she became a mother of twin daughters. The family lives in Hamburg's Eilbek district. In July 2019, the family's house was vandalized.

References

External links 

 

1977 births
Living people
Alliance 90/The Greens politicians
Women members of State Parliaments in Germany
Senators of Hamburg
Members of the Hamburg Parliament
Women ministers of State Governments in Germany
21st-century German women politicians